Putative rRNA methyltransferase 3 is an enzyme that in humans is encoded by the FTSJ3 gene.

Although the function of this gene is not known, the existence of this gene is supported by mRNA and EST data. A possible function of the encoded protein can be inferred from amino acid sequence similarity to the E.coli FtsJ protein and to a mouse protein possibly involved in embryogenesis.

References

Further reading